The Hollywood Freeway is one of the principal freeways of Los Angeles, California (the boundaries of which it does not leave) and one of the busiest in the United States.  It is the principal route through the Cahuenga Pass, the primary shortcut between the Los Angeles Basin and the San Fernando Valley.  It is considered one of the most important freeways in the history of Los Angeles and instrumental in the development of the San Fernando Valley.  It is the second oldest freeway in Los Angeles (after the Arroyo Seco Parkway). From its southern end at the Four Level Interchange to its intersection with the Ventura Freeway in the southeastern San Fernando Valley (the Hollywood Split), it is signed as part of U.S. Route 101. It is then signed as State Route 170 (SR 170) north to its terminus at the Golden State Freeway (Interstate 5).

Route description

The freeway runs from the Four Level Interchange in downtown Los Angeles to the Golden State Freeway in the Sun Valley district of Los Angeles in the San Fernando Valley. From the Four Level Interchange to its intersection with the Ventura Freeway in the southeastern San Fernando Valley (also known as the Hollywood Split), the freeway is signed as part of U.S. Route 101. Afterwards, it is signed as State Route 170 until its northern terminus at Interstate 5.

The intersection of the Hollywood and Pasadena Freeways, known as the Four Level Interchange, is one of the major landmarks in Los Angeles and a symbol of the city's post-World War II development.

California State Route 170
SR 170 begins its northbound route at the junction with the Ventura Freeway, continuing the freeway northwards. US 101 leaves the freeway, merging onto the Ventura Freeway and heads west. SR 134 continues the Ventura Freeway, heading east. On the southbound side, a sign indicates "END Route 170". Curiously, there is no interchange from SR 134 West to US 101 South. This connector route was put on hold pending the construction of the Laurel Canyon Freeway, which never came to fruition. Motorists intending to go in that direction must exit SR 134 at Cahuenga Boulevard, make a left, continue on Lankershim Blvd. and follow the signs near Universal Studios to re-enter on US 101. Likewise, there is no interchange from US 101 North to SR 134 East. Motorists intending to go in that direction must exit US 101 at Vineland Ave., make a right, make another right on Riverside Dr. and enter SR 134 on the left. This interchange is also known as the "Hollywood Split".

SR 170 then continues through the northeastern portion of the San Fernando Valley, finally merging onto northbound I-5. There is no connector route to I-5 South because the angle between the two freeways is too acute.

There are HOV lanes in operation 24 hours a day in each direction of SR-170 between I-5 and the Hollywood Split interchange. There is a direct connection from the northbound SR-170 HOV lanes onto the northbound I-5 HOV lanes, as well as from the southbound I-5 HOV lanes onto the southbound SR-170 HOV lanes. This makes it possible to connect with the I-5 HOV lanes as well as the SR-14 HOV lanes (from the I-5) without merging into regular lanes.

Both this portion of US 101 and the entirety of SR 170 are part of the California Freeway and Expressway System, and are part of the National Highway System, a network of highways that are considered essential to the country's economy, defense, and mobility by the Federal Highway Administration.

As of 2018, Caltrans is planning to add soundwalls to SR-170 in both directions between Sherman Way and the Hollywood Split. There are currently some neighborhoods located near the freeway, which cause noise pollution. Now that soundwalls are in place, it can reduce the noise and reduces smog.

History
Plans for the Hollywood Freeway officially began in 1924 when Los Angeles voters approved a "stop-free express highway" between Downtown Los Angeles and the San Fernando Valley.  The first segment of the Hollywood Freeway built was a one and a half mile stretch through the Cahuenga Pass.  That segment opened on June 15, 1940.  It was then known as the "Cahuenga Pass Freeway".  Pacific Electric Railway trolleys ran down the center of this freeway until 1952.  The next section of the freeway that stretched from the San Fernando Valley to Downtown Los Angeles opened on April 16, 1954 at a cost of $55 million.  The final section, north of the Ventura Freeway to the Golden State Freeway was completed in 1968.

A year after the Hollywood Freeway opened, it was used by an average of 183,000 vehicles a day, almost double the capacity it was designed to carry.  Actor Bob Hope called it the "biggest parking lot in the world" in his routine.

The segment through Hollywood was the first to be built through a heavily populated area and requiring the moving or demolition of many buildings, including Rudolph Valentino's former home in Whitley Heights.  The freeway was also designed to curve around KTTV Studios and Hollywood Presbyterian Church.  Much of the rubble and debris from the buildings removed for the freeway's construction was dumped into Chávez Ravine, the current home to Dodger Stadium.

In 1967, the Hollywood Freeway was the first freeway in California that had ramp meters.

Near the Vermont Avenue exit, there's a seemingly over-wide center strip now filled with trees.  This is where the never-built Beverly Hills Freeway was to merge with the Hollywood Freeway.  Plans for the Beverly Hills Freeway were halted in the 1970s.

The Hollywood Freeway is an expansion of the original Cahuenga Parkway, a short six-lane freeway that ran through the Cahuenga Pass between Hollywood and Studio City.  The Cahuenga Parkway featured Pacific Electric Railway "Red Car" tracks in its median, but by the 1950s these tracks were out of service due to radical reductions in Red Car service.  The Pacific Electric right-of-way later accommodated an additional lane in each direction.

The second location of Los Angeles High School was in the path of the freeway.   The school moved to its third and current location in 1917.  The school buildings were converted into a school for boys with truancy problems until 1948, when it was demolished to make way for the freeway.

SR 170 was originally supposed to run from the I-5 interchange to I-405 near the Los Angeles International Airport as the Laurel Canyon Freeway under the Laurel Canyon Boulevard, Crescent Heights Boulevard and La Cienega Boulevard alignments of today. In fact, much of La Cienega Blvd. between Manchester Avenue and Venice Blvd. was constructed to freeway standards, with several grade-separated interchanges, although it is now an expressway maintained by Los Angeles County.

California's legislature has relinquished state control of the segment of SR 170 along Highland Avenue, and thus that portion is now maintained by the City of Los Angeles.

Exit list

See also

Hollywood Freeway chickens
Suggestion of rail transit along freeway, 1948

References

External links

California @ AARoads - State Route 170
California Highways: SR 170
La Cienega Freeway
Builders Of The Broad Highway Film showing Cahuenga Parkway c1940 construction (~4:22 onwards)
LAistory: Pilgrimage Bridge Cahuenga Parkway completion details
Image of the by-pass built temporarily to ease the traffic during construction of the Hollywood Freeway, California, 1949. Los Angeles Times Photographic Archive (Collection 1429). UCLA Library Special Collections, Charles E. Young Research Library, University of California, Los Angeles.

U.S. Route 101
Named freeways in California
Roads in Los Angeles County, California
Southern California freeways
Transportation in the San Fernando Valley
State highways in California